Mack or Mac Miller may refer to:

People
 Mac Miller (1992–2018; born Malcolm James McCormick) U.S. rapper
 Mack Miller (1931–2020; born Andrew Markley Miller), American cross-country skier and trainer
 Mack Miller (born 1955) U.S. singer, member of The Chi-Lites
 MacKenzie Miller aka "Mack" (1921–2010; born MacKenzie Todd Miller) U.S. horsetrainer

Fictional characters
 Mack Miller (played by Glen Corbett), from the 1950 U.S. drama film The Fireball.
 Mack Miller (played by Raymond McKee), from the 1926 U.S. silent film Exclusive Rights (film)

Business 
 Mack, Miller Candle Company, a formerly prominent candle company, when industrial candle making was the industry of Syracuse, NYS, USA; see History of candle making

See also
 Miller (surname)
 List of people with surname Miller
 Max Miller (disambiguation)
 Mick Miller (disambiguation)
 Miller (disambiguation)